Norman Kenneth Foster  (12 March 192119 November 2006) was a Labor member of the Australian House of Representatives for the seat of Sturt from 1969 to 1972 and then the South Australian Legislative Council from 1975 to 1982. He also served as a signaller with the 2/10th Battalion in North Africa, Papua and Borneo during World War II, and was mentioned in dispatches for his bravery in action.

Early life
Norman was born in Adelaide and left school at 13.  He worked as a labourer until he enlisted in the Second Australian Imperial Force's 2/10th Battalion in 1939 at the outbreak of World War II. He served in England, Tobruk, New Guinea and Borneo, where he was mentioned in dispatches for bravery in action as a signaller.  After the war he worked on the docks in Port Adelaide and became a leader of the Waterside Workers' Federation and president of the Trades and Labor Council in 1964.

Political career
He won the federal seat of Sturt from Liberal incumbent Ian Wilson at the 1969 election with a 50 percent primary and 50.5 percent two-party vote from a 15 percent two-party swing.  Foster's victory in the historically blue-ribbon Liberal seat was part of an 18-seat swing to Labor that nearly ended the Coalition's record tenure in government.  However, Wilson won the seat back at the 1972 election from a 2.7 percent swing even though Labor won government.

Foster then served in the South Australian Legislative Council from 1975 to 1982 and was probably best known for his support of the Tonkin Liberal government's legislation in 1982 to allow the Roxby Downs uranium mine. The legislation was very controversial, and was opposed at the time by Labor. Foster resigned from the Labor Party just before he crossed the floor to give the final vote required to pass the legislation. He ran unsuccessfully for the Legislative Council as an independent Labor candidate in 1982. His ALP membership was reinstated in 1988.

Foster died in Adelaide and was survived by his wife, five children, seven grandchildren and four great-grandchildren.

Footnotes

References
 
 
 
 
 
 
 
 
 
 
 
 
 
 
 
 
 

1921 births
2006 deaths
Members of the Australian House of Representatives for Sturt
Australian Labor Party members of the Parliament of Australia
Members of the South Australian Legislative Council
Australian waterside workers
Australian Labor Party members of the Parliament of South Australia
Recipients of the Medal of the Order of Australia
20th-century Australian politicians
Australian military personnel of World War II